John Gibbons (born 1962) is an American baseball coach and former player

John Gibbons may also refer to:

Politics and law
Sir John Gibbons, 2nd Baronet (c. 1717–1776), British Member of Parliament for Stockbridge (1754–1761) and Wallingford (1761–1768)
John Lloyd Gibbons (1837–1919), British Member of Parliament for Wolverhampton South (1898–1900)
John Joseph Gibbons (1924–2018), American judge
John C. Gibbons (died 2021), Palauan politician

Sports
John Gibbons (cricketer) (1774–1844), English MCC cricketer 
Tex Gibbons (John Haskell Gibbons, 1907–1984), American Olympic basketball player
John Gibbons (pitcher) (1922–2008), American Negro league baseball player
John Gibbons (footballer) (1925–2021), English footballer
John Gibbons (rower) (born 1943), New Zealand representative rower

Others
John Gibbons (Jesuit) (1544–1589), English Jesuit theologian and controversialist
John Gibbons (c. 1690), porter of Whitehall Palace and 'pursuer of coiners', see William Chaloner
John H. Gibbons (naval officer) (1859–1944), captain in the United States Navy
John H. Gibbons (scientist) (1929–2015), American scientist
John Gibbons (activist), Irish environmentalist
John Gibbons (DJ), Irish record producer
John Gibbons (ironmaster), English ironmaster and art patron
John Gibbons, conductor of Worthing Symphony Orchestra

See also
Jackie Gibbons (1914–1984), English football manager
Jack Gibbons, musician
John Gibbon (disambiguation)